GPR182 (or G protein-coupled receptor 182) is a human gene (and associated protein) which is an orphan G-protein coupled receptor.

When this gene was first cloned, it was proposed to encode an adrenomedullin receptor.  However, when the corresponding protein was expressed, it was found not to respond to adrenomedullin (ADM).

It was subsequently shown that a different GPCR, CALCRL when complexed with RAMP2  can function as an ADM receptor.

References

Further reading

External links
 

G protein-coupled receptors